Asociación Deportiva Unión Minas is a Peruvian football club, playing in the city of Orcopampa, Arequipa, Peru.

History
In 2009 Copa Perú, the club advanced to the National Stage, but was eliminated by Diablos Rojos of Puno.

In 2011 Copa Perú, the club advanced to the National Stage, but was eliminated by Real Garcilaso of Cuzco in the Round of 16.

Honours

Regional
Región VII:
Winners (1): 2009
Runner-up (2): 2007, 2011

Liga Departamental de Arequipa:
Winners (1): 2009
Runner-up (3): 2002, 2007, 2011

Liga Superior de Arequipa:
Winners (1): 2009

Liga Provincial de Castilla:
Winners (7): 1997, 1998, 2000, 2001, 2002, 2003, 2008

Liga Distrital de Orcopampa:
Winners (2): 1997, 1998

See also
List of football clubs in Peru
Peruvian football league system

External links
 Los 16 expedientes
 Unión Minas Orcopampa
 Unión Minas de Orcopampa Corazón

Football clubs in Peru
Association football clubs established in 1927